Thorben Marx (born 1 June 1981) is a retired German footballer who last played for Borussia Mönchengladbach.

Honours
Hertha BSC
DFL-Ligapokal: 2001, 2002

References

External links 
  
 

1981 births
Living people
German footballers
Hertha BSC players
Hertha BSC II players
Arminia Bielefeld players
Borussia Mönchengladbach players
Bundesliga players
Germany B international footballers
Footballers from Berlin
Association football midfielders